Chigwell School is a co-educational independent boarding and day school in the English public school tradition located in Chigwell, in the Epping Forest district of Essex. It consists of a pre-prep (ages 4–7), Junior School (ages 7–11), Senior School (ages 11–16) and sixth form. A pre-preparatory department for children aged 4–7 was constructed starting for the 2013–14 academic year.

The school is situated in 100 acres of land between Epping Forest and Hainault Forest, ten miles from London. It is a member of the Headmasters' and Headmistresses' Conference (HMC) and the Junior School is a member of the Independent Association of Prep Schools (IAPS).

The school motto is aut viam inveniam aut faciam, a Latin phrase which translates literally as “Find a way or make a way”.

There are four day houses, named Caswalls', Lambourne, Penn's, and Swallow's after alumni. The school owns several artifacts which belonged to each of the alumni after which the houses are named.
The boarding houses are Church House, Harsnett's, Sandon Lodge, and Hainault House, although all boarders are members of one of the day houses. In the Junior School there are another four houses, named Windsors, Hanovers, Stuarts, and Tudors.

History 

Chigwell School dates back to 1619 when a schoolhouse was erected on the site. The first headmaster Peter Mease was appointed in 1623. It was formally founded in 1629 by Samuel Harsnett, Archbishop of York and Vice-Chancellor of Cambridge University, and began with 16 "poor, clever" scholars.

In 1868, the school was split into two sections. The English section for local children studying arithmetic, reading and writing was housed in a building behind the King's Head public house, which was mentioned in Charles Dickens' novel Barnaby Rudge: A Tale of the Riots of 'Eighty. The Latin section (for Latin scholars only) remained in the original building. Rather unusually for a boys' school at that time, in 1873, it started a bursary programme for girls to attend other schools.

Following a trend set by many HMC schools (which were mainly all-boys), the sixth form section became coeducational and its first girls were admitted in the summer term of 1974. In 1997 coeducation was extended to the rest of the school.

Chapel 

The War Memorial Chapel was dedicated by the Bishop of Chelmsford on 10 October 1924 to the 78 Old Boys and one Master who had lain down their lives in the Great War and on each side of the altar, plaques record the names of the dead. There were only a total of 80 boys attending the school in 1914.
Reginald Hallward took the theme of the Pilgrim's Progress for the windows of  the chapel. He depicted schoolboys as Christian's companions on his pilgrimage.

Notable alumni 

George Baker CBE, High Commissioner to Papua New Guinea (1974–1977)
 Peter Beckingham, Ambassador to the Philippines since 2005
 Prof Sir John Boardman (born 1927), classical archaeologist
 Ken Campbell, actor
 Edward Caswall, classical scholar and writer of hymns, music master at Chigwell.
 Peter Collecott CMG, Ambassador to Brazil from 2004-8
 Richard Collins FRCS, Vice-President, Royal College of Surgeons 2010
 Tim Collins, Conservative politician, MP for Westmorland and Lonsdale from 1997–2005
 William Cotton, Governor of the Bank of England, who famously set fire to the Headmaster's garden.
 Sir Richard Dales KCVO, CMG, former Ambassador to Norway from 1998–2002
 Paul Farmer MBE (1961–68), former Headmaster of London comprehensive schools; developed use of pop music in schools, including the first CSE examination in pop music
 Pete Flint, Internet Entrepreneur, Founder of Trulia
 Vice-Adm Sir Robert Gerken KCB CBE, Captain of the Fleet from 1978–81
 Sir Arthur Grimble, colonial governor
 Sir Austin Bradford Hill, pioneering medical researcher who discovered the link between smoking and cancer
 Steriker Hare, cricketer
 Sir Ian Holm, actor
 Anthony Hossack (1882–1886) England footballer of the 1890s.
 William Penn, Quaker leader and founder of the state of Pennsylvania in the United States of America
 Sir David Pepper, Director of GCHQ from 2003-8
 Prof James B. Ramsey, Professor of Economics at New York University
 Timothy Rollinson CBE, Director-General of the Forestry Commission since 2004, and President from 2000-2 of the Institute of Chartered Foresters
 Rt Rev Thomas Joseph Savage
 Ben Shephard, television presenter
 Horace Smith, poet
 Michael Marshall Smith, novelist
 Jordan Spence, footballer, Ipswich Town 2017
 Rt Rev Tim Stevens, Bishop of Leicester from 1991 until 1999
 Col Bob Stewart MP DSO
 Sir Edward Albert Stone, Chief Justice of Western Australia, 1901–06
 Michael Thomas, former Attorney General of Hong Kong
 Sir Colin Thornton-Kemsley, MP for Kincardine and Western Aberdeenshire from 1939–50 and North Angus and Mearns from 1950–64
 Sir Bernard Williams, philosopher and Provost of King's College, Cambridge
 Prof Nicholas Williams, scholar of the Irish and Cornish languages.
 Timothy Williams, crime novelist
 Alan Winnington, British communist, journalist, anthropologist, war correspondent, author of children's fiction and crime thrillers

Notable masters 
 Robert James, headmaster 1939–1946, later High Master of St Paul's School and headmaster of Harrow School
 Anthony Little, headmaster 1989–1996, later headmaster of Eton College from 2002–2015.
 William Henry Monk, music master, and author of the music to Abide With Me.

References

External links 

 Chigwell School website
 Old Chigwellians website
 archive mentioning tunnel
 Profile on the ISC website

Buildings and structures in Chigwell
1629 establishments in England
Educational institutions established in the 1620s
Boarding schools in Essex
Private schools in Essex
Member schools of the Headmasters' and Headmistresses' Conference

Grade II* listed buildings in Essex